Marshmallow is a 1942 picture book by Clare Turlay Newberry. The story is about the title character, a pet baby bunny named Marshmallow, and his new friend Oliver, a pet cat. The book was a recipient of a 1943 Caldecott Honor for its illustrations.

References

1942 children's books
American picture books
Caldecott Honor-winning works